The 1936 All-Big Six Conference football team consists of American football players chosen by various organizations for All-Big Six Conference teams for the 1936 college football season.  The selectors for the 1936 season included the Associated Press (AP).

All-Big Six selections

Backs
 Jack Frye, Missouri (AP-1)
 Lloyd Cardwell, Nebraska (AP-1)
 Maurice Elder, Kansas State (AP-1)
 Sam Francis, Nebraska (AP-1)

Ends
 Les McDonald, Nebraska (AP-1)
 Clarence Gustine, Iowa State (AP-1)

Tackles
 Fred Shirey, Nebraska (AP-1)
 Paul Fanning, Kansas State (AP-1)

Guards
 Kenneth McGinnis, Nebraska (AP-1)
 Rolla Holland, Kansas State (AP-1)

Centers
 Red Conkright, Oklahoma (AP-1)

Key
AP = Associated Press

See also
1936 College Football All-America Team

References

All-Big Six Conference football team
All-Big Eight Conference football teams